This is a list of people from Doncaster, in South Yorkshire, England, and includes people from the town of Doncaster and the wider Metropolitan Borough of Doncaster, which encompasses Mexborough, Conisbrough, Thorne and Finningley. This list is arranged alphabetically by surname.

A
Thomas Aldham, early Quaker
Dave Allen, boxer
Louise Armstrong, feminist author
Mark Atkins, footballer

B
Douglas Bader, fighter pilot who continued to fly after losing his legs (born in London but brought up in Sprotborough)
Jessica Baglow, actress who played Lucy Snow in Where the Heart Is and Karla Bentham on BBC drama series Waterloo Road
Lee Beevers, Walsall F.C. professional footballer, ex-Lincoln City F.C., Boston United F.C. and Colchester United F.C. player
John Francis Bentley, church architect, most famous for Westminster Cathedral
Rodney Bickerstaffe, past leader of UNISON and former president of the Pensioners' National Convention; brought up and educated in Doncaster 
Brian Blessed (born 1936), Mexborough-born TV and film actor
Liam Botham, rugby player and cricketer; son of cricketer Ian Botham
Billy Bremner, professional international footballer for Scotland and manager; born in Stirling, (Scotland), but later lived and died in Doncaster
Chris Brown (born 1984), professional footballer
Steve Burton (born 1983), professional footballer
Andy Butler, professional footballer

C
Anthony Card, first-class cricketer
Emma Chambers, TV, film and stage actress
Tony Christie, singer and musical performer; born in Conisbrough, outside Doncaster
Roy Clarke, scriptwriter, Keeping Up Appearances, Open All Hours and Last of the Summer Wine
Jeremy Clarkson, journalist and television presenter
Thomas Crapper, credited with popularising the modern flush toilet

D
Richard Dawson, England test cricket player
Mella Dee, born Ryan Aitchison, DJ and music producer
Neil Dudgeon, television actor
Sir Patrick Duffy, former Labour MP for Sheffield Attercliffe and Colne Valley, grew up in Rossington and lives in Doncaster
Michael Dugher, former Labour MP for Barnsley East and Vice-Chair of the Labour Party

F
John Field, ballet dancer, choreographer and director with Royal Ballet; founder artistic director of Birmingham Royal Ballet
David Firth, animator, best known for his work using Flash animation tools, e.g. in the Salad Fingers series
Caroline Flint, Former Don Valley Labour MP and minister of state for Europe; lives in Sprotborough
Tan France, English fashion designer and television personality

G
Lesley Garrett, singer from Thorne, Doncaster
Margo Gunn, actress in Taggart, Doctor Finlay and Coronation Street

H
William Hague, "Iron Hague", Mexborough-born champion boxer
Kelly Harrison, actress from BBC Casualty series
Mike Hawthorn, Formula One World Champion
Joe Harvey, Edlington-born player and manager of Newcastle United F. C.
Darius Henderson, born in Sutton, London, but raised in Doncaster, professional footballer
Sam Hird, ex-Doncaster Rovers and current Chesterfield FC player
Thomas Howes, actor, best known as William in ITV's Downton Abbey
Kevin Hughes (died 2006), member of Parliament
Benjamin Huntsman, inventor and steel manufacturer
Brett Hutton, cricketer
Graham Hyde, professional footballer and manager

J
India Jordan – electronic music producer and DJ

K
Kevin Keegan, Armthorpe-born, professional international footballer and manager of the England national football team
Lindsey Kelk, writer of the "I heart" chick lit series

L
Shelley Longworth, comedy actress, known for playing Sam in Series 4–5 of the ITV comedy drama Benidorm
Richard Lumb, First-class cricketer
Carl Lygo, Vice-Chancellor of BPP University; Director of Doncaster Rovers Belles
Louis William Tomlinson, compositor, singer.

M
Julia Mallam, Emmerdale actress
John McLaughlin (born 1942), guitarist born in Kirk Sandall, co-creator (with Miles Davis) of the jazz/rock genre in the late 1960s and leader of Mahavishnu Orchestra and Shakti "fusion" bands
Alan Menter, Doncaster-born rugby union player for South Africa; dermatologist
Mary Millar, actress known as Rose in Keeping Up Appearances
Danny Mitchell, UFC & Bellator Fighter
David Moffett (born 1947), Doncaster-born business manager for Sport England, Welsh Rugby Union and other sports
Adie Moses, Doncaster-born former football player for Barnsley F.C.

P
John Parr, singer of St Elmo's Fire
David Pegg, Manchester United F. C. player, victim of Munich air disaster
Jonti Picking, also known as "Weebl", author of the web cartoon Weebl & Bob
George Porter, Nobel Prize-winning physical chemist
Marguerite Porter, ballerina and actress
Dennis Priestley, darts player

R
Ricky Ravenhill, professional footballer
Diana Rigg, actress best known for ITV series The Avengers, the HBO series Game of Thrones, and as Bond girl in On Her Majesty's Secret Service
Graham Rix, professional football manager and former England international footballer
William Rokeby (died 1521), archbishop of Dublin; born and died in Kirk Sandall
Dennis Rollins, jazz trombonist who lived in Doncaster from an early age and joined Doncaster Youth Jazz Orchestra at 14
Danny Rose, professional footballer
Mitch Rose, professional footballer
John Ryan, previous chairman of Doncaster Rovers F.C.
Mark Ryan, actor, known for roles in the ITV series Robin of Sherwood, the Starz series Black Sails, and various voices in the Transformers (film series)

S
Danny Schofield, professional footballer and coach
Brian Shenton, sprinter representing England and Britain in the 1950s
Sarah Stevenson, bronze medallist in Taekwondo at the 2008 Summer Olympics in Beijing

T
Lady Juliet Tadgell, Countess Fitzwilliam
Lawrence Taylor, lead vocalist with metal band While She Sleeps
Louis Tomlinson (born 24 December 1991),  singer-songwriter member of the band One Direction
James Toseland (born 1980), Doncaster-born MotoGP motorcycle racer, 2004 and 2007 Superbike World Champion
Anna Tunnicliffe, Olympic sailor
Gordon Turner (1930–1976), professional footballer, who still holds the record for most goals scored for Luton Town

W
Steve Wade, executioner
Ian Wardle, professional footballer
Simon Weaver, professional footballer
Roger Webster, musician
Andrew White, presenter and producer of Walks Around Britain and writer of The Walker Mysteries novels.
Len White (born 1930), professional footballer
Mick Whitnall, lead guitarist with Babyshambles
Dean Winstanley, darts player
Chloe Wilburn, winner of Big Brother 16 (UK) and biggest prize fund in Big Brother UK history
Bruce Woodcock, heavyweight boxing champion of Great Britain and the Empire

Y
Yungblud, television actor and alternative rock musician whose real name is Dominic Harrison

References

Doncaster
 
People from Doncaster